The Robidoux family played a major role in settling Canada and America from the 17th to the 19th centuries.  This family was instrumental in the history of New France in Canada, and the expansion of American territories to such places as St. Joseph, Missouri, and San Bernardino, California.  The descendants of the patriarch Manuel Robidoux are well known. They are discussed in Meriwether Lewis’ journals, James Michener's book Centennial, and have been chronicled as traveling with frontiersman Kit Carson, as referenced below.

Manuel Robidoux
Manuel Robidoux (Robido), born c. 1620, was of Santa Maria, Galicia, Spain. He married Catherine Alve. He is often incorrectly identified as of Paris, France. There is no evidence to support this.  This misinformation came from the self-published book Memorial to the Robidoux Brothers: a History of the Robidouxs in America by Orral Messmore Robidoux.

André Robidou
André Robidou (c. 1643 – 1678) was the son of Manuel Robido and Catharine Alve.  According to Canadian vital and church records, he was born in the parish of Santa Maria, likely Pontevedra, Galicia,  Spain which was then in the See or bishopric of Burgos that at that time covered most of northern Spain. He is often incorrectly being of the city of Burgos because of this. He was married to Jeanne Denote (1645-1701), the fifth daughter of Antoine Denote and Catherine Leduc, of Saint-Germain-l'Auxerrois, Paris. André came to Canada after Louis XIV, King of France, made Quebec a royal province and began colonizing what was then known as New France.  We know nothing of André's life in Galicia prior to 20 April 1661 when he is engaged contractually as a sailor in Nantes, Brittany (now Loire-Atlantique, Pays-de-la-Loire, France). André, now in La Rochelle, Aunis (currently Charente-Maritime, Poitou-Charentes, France) enters a contract of engagement with Antoine Grignon, on behalf of merchant Eustache Lambert, obligating André to go to Nouvelle-France and work for 3 years. 
Late spring or summer working as a member of the crew, André sails from La Rochelle, France to Île-Percé (on the Gaspé Peninsula of Quebec), Acadia and finally to Quebec aboard La Marguerite, a ship originally hailing from Dieppe, Normandy, (now Seine-Maritime), France. He arrives in the city of Quebec in late summer 1664. He came in some capacity for the fur trade but also would establish himself as a habitant. Later in  1664, André receives a concession of land in what is now Saint-Laurent on Île d'Orléans down river from Quebec. On 13 May 1665 André Robidou signs on as a sailor aboard the royal galiotte a type of small ship that worked the river trade hailing from Quebec. He then receives a concession of land on Côte Lauzon (now Lévis, Quebec), on 15 June 1665. He later gives up his concession of land on Côte Lauzon and Île-d'Orléans. He appears in the 1666 Quebec census as a matelot/sailor in the service of Eustache Lambert. André's wife was one of the Filles du Roi, the King's Daughters, sent to Quebec to promote marriage, family formation, birth of children and therefore expansion of population.  The date of their marriage is 7 June 1667 in the city of Quebec.  We know from her marriage record that her mother was still living in Paris but her father was not. She arrived on board the first ship to sail from France in the year 1667 and arrived in the city of Québec that April. André and Jeanne had five children, the first daughter born in Québec in 1669, the rest including Guillaume Robidou, were born in La Prairie having moved there around 1671. André died 31 Mar 1678, about 35, in La Prairie, then buried in Montreal. His widow Jeanne married Jacques Suprenant and thus became the founding mother of not one, but two of Canada's largest families.

Guillaume Robidou
Guillaume Robidou (25 November 1675 – 8 July 1754) was the son of André Robidou and Jeanne Denote.  He was born in La Prairie, Quebec, Canada, and part of the first generation of the Robidoux family born in North America.

Guillaume married Marie Françoise Guérin (1681-1757) on 11 June 1697 in Montreal.  Marie was born on 25 Apr 1681 in Cernay-les-Reims, France to Sylvain Guerin and Marie Brazeau and came to Canada at an early age with her parents.  Her father was a cobbler and mother a cabaret performer. Marie Françoise Guérin was born and christened on 17 Oct 1680 in Amboise, Tours, Touraine, Indre-et-Loire, France. She married Guillaume at 16 a year after her father's death in France. However, he had left some nine years earlier when she would have been seven. He had married Marie Brazeau at St-Denis in Amboise 30-10-1679. He was returned to France around 1688 and was hanged for bigamy. His first legal wife is unknown but is clear he went to New France with Marie ahead of the law. Françoise was the eldest of her mother's six children, only one of whom shared her father as well. Guillaume and Françoise moved to Longueuil, a town adjacent to La Prairie, in 1705.  The barony of Longueuil was founded by Charles le Moyne de Longueuil et de Châteauguay who emigrated from France.

Guillaume was a teenager at the time of the British attempt to capture Quebec (the Battle of Quebec) in 1690 and likely took part in the city's defence. (This is doubtful as the battle took place in the city of Quebec and he would have been in La Prairie.) Guillaume entered the fur trade in Canada as it was steadily growing.  Guillaume and Françoise had 13 children, four of whom died before their first birthday.  Joseph Robidoux I was the second son, born 20 March 1701, the great-grandfather of the famous Robidoux brothers who helped explore, open trade routes and settle the western United States. Guillaume died on 8 July 1754 in Montreal, and was buried at the Basilique Notre-Dame.

Joseph Robidoux I 
Joseph Robidoux I (20 March 1701 – 1778), the second son of Guillaume Robidou and Marie Françoise Guérin.  He was born in La Prairie, Quebec, Canada, and was part of the second generation of the Robidoux family born in North America. Because of the large number of descendants named Joseph Robidoux, the significant ones are highlighted by Roman numerals, even though they did not use such an indicator during their lives.

The vulnerabilities demonstrated by the Battle of Quebec in 1690 caused the Canadians to bolster defensive positions, which served their purpose until the Battle of Quebec (Battle of the Plains of Abraham) in 1759 when the British were successful in their assault. This was known by the British as part of the Annus Mirabilis of 1759.  Two of the sons of Joseph, François and Antoine, died in this battle. Following his father's profession, Joseph entered the fur trade at its peak.  By the middle half of the 18th century the fur trade was in a slow decline, and Joseph's children began migrating south to American cities such as Detroit, Chicago and St. Louis.

He married twice, first to Marie-Anne Fonteneau (1 December 1699 – 16 February 1735), daughter of Pierre Fonteneau, and had six children including Joseph Robidoux II. Widowed, Joseph married second to Marie-Louise Robert (b. 17 October 1715), daughter of André Robert, and had seven children.  Joseph died In Yamaska, Quebec, Canada, in 1778.

Joseph Robidoux II  
Joseph Robidoux II (13 September 1722 – 28 August 1778) was the son of Joseph Robidoux I and Marie-Anne Fonteneau.  Joseph was part of the second generation of the Robidoux family born in North America.  He married Marie Anne Le Blanc (1724-1770), whose great-grandparents emigrated from Normandy, France, in the 17th century.

With the slowing of the fur trade and repeated conflicts with the British, Joseph and his family began to look south for better prospects.  War between France and England in the colonies resumed in the War of Jenkins' Ear in 1739, with France in alliance with Spain.  The fortress at Louisbourg was constructed to protect to Gulf of St. Lawrence and to allow the French to raid British sites in New England.  The Siege of Louisbourg in 1745 resulted in the capture of the fortress.  Following this, Joseph and his family traversed the Chicago Portage to relocate to St. Louis.  Members of the family also settled in Detroit.

Marie also came from a distinguished family that settled in Quebec in the 18th century.  Her great-grandfather was Abraham Martin l’Écossais (the Scotsman), a royal pilot on the St. Lawrence River.  The Plains of Abraham are named for him.  This is where a famous battle of the Seven Years' War (the French and Indian War) between the British and the French was fought in 1759.

Joseph and Marie had four children, including Joseph Robidoux III.  Joseph died in St. Louis, Missouri, in 1778.

Joseph Robidoux III and later generations 
Joseph III and his wife Catherine Marie Rollet had eight children that lived to adulthood including:

 Joseph Robidoux IV, referred to as the Founder, due to his founding of St. Joseph, Missouri,
 Antoine Robidoux, and
 Louis Robidoux, founder of Riverside, California

Today, the Robidoux family is widespread throughout North America, with thousands of descendants active in preserving the legacy of their common ancestor Manuel.

Sources 

 Willoughby, Robert J., The Brothers Robidoux and the Opening of the American West, University of Missouri Press, Columbia, 2012
 Lewis, Hugh M., Robidoux Chronicicles, French-Indian Etnoculture of the Trans-Mississippi West, Trafford, Canada, 2004
 Hafen, Leroy R. (ed.), Trappers of the Far West, University of Nebraska Press, Lincoln, 1965
 Reyher, Ken, Antoine Robidoux and Fort Uncompahgre, The Story of a Colorado Fur Trader, Western Reflections Publishing Company, Lake City, Colorado, 1998
 Thwaites, Reuben Gold (ed.), Original Journals of the Lewis & Clark Expedition, 1804-1806, Arno Press, New York, 1969
 Michener, James A., Centennial, Random House, New York, 1974, pg. 300

French-Canadian families